SimTown is a 1995 video game published by Maxis, much like the best-selling SimCity but on a smaller scale. SimTown allows the player to construct a town consisting of streets, houses, businesses and parks and then control the people in it. SimTown was one of the many 'Sim' spin-offs at the time, and was targeted more towards children. Macintosh version was released in May 1995.

The Super Famicom version of SimTown is titled  and was published by Imagineer exclusively in Japan.

Gameplay
The game structure of SimTown is similar to SimCity, but on a generally smaller and simplified scale, in which players are instead tasked with crafting a small town. Players are allocated a blank and flat tract of land, where they will be required to place homes, workplaces, and civic buildings. In addition, other elements such as roads and flora can be placed, although they have no practical use beyond beautification, and consume water resources.

The primary objective of SimTown is to keep the town's citizens happy. This can be achieved by ensuring that water supply, trees, farm crops, and the recycling/air quality program remain well maintained and well funded, with the allocation of "credits" given at each stint. The amount of these resources required for the town and the credits awarded will depend on how much has been built in the town. Trees and ponds, for example, may consume a certain amount of water, while most businesses and homes will generate garbage that must be dealt with using the recycling program. If these resources are not kept in check, the town may experience negative repercussions, such as the presence of dying trees and dried-up ponds if a water supply is not sufficiently provided. This aspect of the game may be compared with the annual or monthly budgets seen in SimCity; however, there are no signs of actual currency used in SimTown aside from the credits allocated for the external resources; there is no monetary cost associated with landscaping or the construction of buildings.

Like SimCity, SimTown places an emphasis on ensuring that a balance between the number of residents and jobs is adequately regulated and maintained. Each household in a home contains two children, a pet, and two adults; the latter may need to find jobs in businesses or civic buildings placed by players. Likewise, businesses and civic buildings require a sufficient number of workers to function properly. If residents are unable to find jobs after a while, indications of their long-term unemployment will show when their home rots and is eventually reduced to rubble (and its inhabitants move out). Similarly, if a business or civic building lacks sufficient employees, the buildings will decay and eventually collapse into rubble.

SimTown allows a player to monitor the town's condition with a feature that allows players to craft and name a resident, who will provide basic feedback and daily activities through diary entries. A local newspaper is also provided to monitor the general conditions of the town. SimTown also awards players with trophies and prize ribbons by meeting certain objectives and requirements. There are also several easter eggs hidden in the game.

Reception
MacUser gave Sim Town a score of 3.5 out of 5, and named it one of 1995's top 50 CD-ROMs.

Next Generation reviewed the Macintosh version of the game, rating it 1 star out of five, calling it "A good title for parents whose kids spend too much time on the computer."

References

External links
 

1995 video games
City-building games
Classic Mac OS games
Imagineer games
Maxis Sim games
OS/2 games
PlayStation (console) games
Super Nintendo Entertainment System games
Video games developed in the United States
Video games with isometric graphics
Windows games